is a passenger railway station located in Somei-cho, Aki City, Kōchi Prefecture, Japan. The station is operated by the third-sector Tosa Kuroshio Railway, and serves the nearby Aki General Hospital. The station, which opened on 13 March 2021, is the first new infill station to be opened on the Asa Line since the opening of the Asa Line in 2002.

Station layout
The station, which is unstaffed, is located on an embankment, consisting of one side platform located north of the single track that runs through the station. Stairs and a lift provide access to the station from street level, located below the platform. All trains on the Asa Line stop at the station, including rapid trains.

Adjacent stations

Station mascot
Each station on the Asa Line features a cartoon mascot character designed by Takashi Yanase, a local cartoonist from Kōchi Prefecture who deceased in 2013. The mascot for Aki-Sogo-byoin-mae Station is a nurse in pink uniform named , newly designed by the Yanase Studio in the same style as Yanase for the station's opening in 2021. The nurse theme relates to the hospital near to the station.

History
The Council for the Revitalisation of the Gomen-Nahari Line announced on 5 December 2018 that it had reached a decision to construct an infill station to serve the Aki General Hospital. The station name was finalised as Aki General Hospital Station on 18 December 2020, and the station itself opened to passengers on 13 March 2021.

Surrounding area
Aki General Hospital
Japan National Route 55

See also 
List of railway stations in Japan

References

External links

Railway stations in Japan opened in 2021
Railway stations in Kōchi Prefecture
Aki, Kōchi